Third Street Bridge is a historic bridge over the Cannon River in Cannon Falls, Minnesota, United States. It is a Pennsylvania through truss bridge constructed of steel. It was listed on the National Register of Historic Places in 1989. It is also part of the "Iron and Steel Bridges in Minnesota" Multiple Property Nomination.

The Minnesota Highway Commission did not have design control over many bridges built in the state in the early 20th century, but they were able to influence the plans via financial incentives.  Louis P. Wolff, who also designed Bridge No. 12 in Goodhue County, designed the plans for this bridge, and the city of Cannon Falls sought funding from the state.  The state highway commission made some minor changes to the plans before approving them.  The Pennsylvania through truss design is relatively uncommon in Minnesota.

An August 2014 report on the bridge points out that the bridge is in fair to poor condition and is posted with a weight limit of 5 tons.  When the bridge was inspected, the stringers and floorbeams were corroded, the paint was failing, the bridge bearings were frozen in place, and the concrete abutments and wing walls were scaled and cracked.

References

External links

 Third Street Bridge (Bridge L5391)

Bridges completed in 1909
Buildings and structures in Goodhue County, Minnesota
National Register of Historic Places in Goodhue County, Minnesota
Pennsylvania truss bridges in the United States
Road bridges on the National Register of Historic Places in Minnesota
Steel bridges in the United States